Nymphonia is a genus of moths of the family Yponomeutidae.

Species
Nymphonia zaleuca - Meyrick, 1913 

Yponomeutidae